The RGM-40 Kastet (English: Brass knuckles) grenade launcher is a stand-alone version of the Russian GP-30 grenade launcher with a telescoping stock, AK-type pistol-grip and flip-up tangent sights. It is a single-shot muzzle loaded weapon with a self-cocking trigger mechanism and offers a high degree of commonality with the GP-30. It was designed primarily for police use and  can use a wide range non-lethal ammunition (e.g., tear gas, stun grenades, etc.). It can also use standard 40mm VOG-25 and VOG-25P fragmentation grenades.

Users
: Russian Interior Ministry

See also
RGS-50M: 50mm grenade launcher
GM-94
RGSh-30
DP-64
BS-1 Tishina
RG-6 grenade launcher
M79 Grenade Launcher
China Lake Grenade Launcher
HK 69 Grenade Launcher
HK M320
EAGLE grenade launcher
B&T GL-06 Grenade Launcher
Pallad grenade launcher
Fort-600 Grenade Launcher

References

Grenade launchers of Russia
Riot guns
Teargas grenade guns
Riot control weapons
Caseless firearms
Military equipment introduced in the 1990s